George Clayton Foulk (October 30, 1856 – 1893) was a United States Navy officer and U.S. Naval Attache to the Kingdom of Korea in 1876. He also served as chargé d'affaires to the Kingdom of Korea in the absence of the American minister or consul.

Early life
George Clayton Foulk was born in Marietta, Pennsylvania, son of Clayton and Caroline Foulk.

U.S. naval career
George Foulk graduated, from the United States Naval Academy. Foulk in went to Asia in 1876 on the ship Alert. He made a 427-mile journey through Japan, then returned to the United States over land, via Korea, Siberia, and Europe. Foulk became fluent in Japanese and Korean; when a Korean mission arrived, in 1883, he was the only person in Washington who could interpret between the two countries.  He was appointed U.S. Naval Attache to Korea and, after arriving there, embarked on two long journeys by sedan chair around the country. On the longer journey, which lasted 43 days, his visit included Gongju, Gwangju, Haeinsa, Busan, Daegu, and Mungyeong.  A coup occurred in Seoul during the latter part of this journey and the Koreans' hospitality turned to hostility from those who took him to be a Japanese spy.

U.S. envoy to the Kingdom of Korea
Foulk served as the acting chargé d'affaires to the Kingdom of Korea, from 1885–1886 and again, from 1886–1887.  Soon after his relief by William Harwar Parker, Foulk was sent back to Korea after a report reached Washington, D.C. that Parker was a "chronic drunkard" who suffered from alcoholism.  The United States government considered the situation so serious that a squadron of naval vessels was diverted to intercept Foulk's passenger liner and return him to Korea as soon as possible.

George Foulk was finally recalled several months later and relieved by Hugh A. Dinsmore, with the U.S. acting, at the behest of the Chinese government.  The Chinese were unhappy with Foulk's attempts to build up Korea's ability, to counteract Chinese and Japanese influence.

Last years
After his recall, George Foulk became a teacher, at Doshisha College (now Doshisha University), in Kyoto, Japan. On September 7, 1887, he married a Japanese national, Murase Kane, with whom he had corresponded while in Korea.

Death
George Foulk died in 1893. He and wife, were buried together, in the Nyakuoji Cemetery, Kyoto.

References 
 "Recollections of a Naval Officer", William Harwar Parker (Published 1883)
 America's Man in Korea: The Private Letters of George C. Foulk, 1884–1887, Samuel Hawley, Lexington Books, 2007
 Inside the Hermit Kingdom: The 1884 Travel Diary of George Clayton Foulk by Samuel Hawley

External links 

 Guide to the George Clayton Foulk Papers at The Bancroft Library
 Photos and Maps of George C. Foulk's at the American Geographical Society Library, UW Milwaukee

Ambassadors of the United States to Korea
1893 deaths
1856 births
United States naval attachés
People from Marietta, Pennsylvania